Trichosanthin is a ribosome-inactivating protein.  It is derived from Trichosanthes kirilowii.  It is also an abortifacient.

References

External links
 

Proteins
Ribosome-inactivating proteins